The Nederlands Letterenfonds ("Dutch Foundation for Literature") is a Dutch organization that promotes Dutch literature at home and abroad. The Letterenfonds represents Dutch authors at such events as the Frankfurt Book Fair, and awards a number of prizes for writers and translators. Its current president is Tiziano Perez.

As of 2018 the Nederlands Letterenfonds is one of the organisations that awards the Toneelschrijfprijs.

References

External links

Cultural promotion organizations
Foundations based in the Netherlands